The 2006 Champions Trophy may refer to the following sporting competitions:

 2006 ICC Champions Trophy, a 10-team cricket tournament at various venues in India
 2006 Men's Hockey Champions Trophy, a 6-team field hockey tournament in Terrassa, Spain
 2006 Women's Hockey Champions Trophy, a 6-team field hockey tournament in Amstelveen, Netherlands